Youssouf Diallo (born 4 April 1984 in Conakry) is a Guinean football midfielder.

Diallo played two seasons in the Segunda División with Racing de Ferrol, making his league debut on 28 August 2004.

Clubs 
 2003-04 :  RKC Waalwijk
 2004-07 :  Racing de Ferrol
 2004-04 :  O Val (loan)
 2007-08 :  La Soledad
 2008-09 :  UD Villa de Santa Brígida
 2009- :  SD Tenisca

References

1984 births
Living people
Guinean footballers
Racing de Ferrol footballers
Association football midfielders